Yichuan railway station is a station on the Hangzhou-Changsha High-Speed Railway, which is a part of the Shanghai-Kunming High-Speed Railway. It is located in Yichun, Jiangxi, China. The former name of this station was Yichun East Railway.

References

Railway stations in Jiangxi